A by-election was held for the New South Wales Legislative Assembly electorate of Mudgee on 19 December 1859 because of the resignation of Lyttleton Bayley.  Bayley had been appointed to the Legislative Council in January 1859, shortly after arriving in the colony and the following month was appointed Attorney General in the Cowper Government. The government fell in October 1859 and Bayley resigned from parliament the following month.

Dates

Results

Lyttleton Bayley resigned.

See also
Electoral results for the district of Mudgee
List of New South Wales state by-elections

References

1859 elections in Australia
New South Wales state by-elections
1850s in New South Wales